Franz Müller-Gossen (1871 – 16 March 1946) was a German painter from Mönchengladbach, Germany. He studied in Düsseldorf and is known for realistic maritime paintings showing sailing ships and steamships, sailing the high seas or by in bad weather conditions. Although he did not receive any fame while living, maritime art connoisseurs in Europe and in the United States recently grew interested in his works.

Four paintings, amongst them Dampfer in bewegter See (Steamship in agitated sea) and Vollschiff unter Segeln (Clipper downwind), are currently visible since 1990 in the Warleberger Hof city museum (Schleswig-Holstein, Germany).

External links 
  Dampfer in bewegter See, Stadtmuseum Warleberger Hof
  Vollschiff unter Segeln, Stadtmuseum Warleberger Hof

1871 births
1946 deaths
19th-century German painters
19th-century German male artists
20th-century German painters
20th-century German male artists
German male painters
German marine artists